Steve Gukas is a Nollywood filmmaker, director and producer who believes that films should be used to address the ills of the society.

Education
Gukas studied Television Production at NTA TV College in Jos, Theatre Arts at the University of Jos and Film production at the London Film School, United Kingdom.

Career
He is a former managing director of a Nigerian radio station, WE FM.

In 2002, he directed the movie "Keeping Faith". In 2007, he produced the iconic movie, "Namibia: The Struggle for Liberation", featuring the American actor, Danny Glover; it was his first project.

In 2014, the film he directed and produced, "A Place in the Stars" was released. The film was produced in honour of Dora Akunyili, the late Director-General of the National Agency for Food and Drug Administration and Control (NAFDAC), who fought against the production, sales and usage of adulterated drugs in Nigeria. The movie starred Segun Arinze, Dejumo Lewis, Matilda Obaseki, Gideon Okeke, Yemi Blaq and Femi Branch. Later on, at the 2015 Africa Magic Viewers Choice Awards (AMVCA), the movie won the Best Movie (Drama) award.

In 2016, he directed the movie, "93 Days", a movie created in memory of Dr. Stella Ameyo Adadevoh, a late Nigerian physician who alongside other health workers in Lagos, helped stop the spread of the Ebola virus in Nigeria by sacrificing herself to the task in 2014. The movie featured Nollywood actors and Bimbo Akintola, Danny Glover, Seun Ajayi, Keppy Ekpeyong and Bimbo Manuel. The film streams on NETFLIX. The movie, alongside two others ("Isoken" and "The Bridge") were the first movies to be screened in the "Nollywood in Hollywood" initiative's first edition. The movie premiered in early September 2016 at the Toronto International Film Festival and at the Chicago International Film Festival.

He also produced, "Keeping The Faith" and "Mr. Johnson". He, as well desires to make a film on the Nigeria's Plateau State capital, Jos.

He was part of the discussants at the 2017 Rapid Lion South African International Film Festival in which participants discussed the present and future of the African Cinema.

He was a co-producer of a sequel to the movie which gave birth to Nigeria's Nollywood, titled "Living in Bondage", originally produced in 1992, who according to Ramsey Nouah, the film's director as well as an actor in reference to Gukas, had "a reputation of doing big projects". The film featured actors like Kenneth Okonkwo, Kanayo O. Kanayo and Bob-Manuel Udokwu, Enyinna Nwigwe and Kalu Ikeagwu.

In the AMVCA awards 2020, for the 2019 movie, "Living in Bondage", he won the "Best Movie West Africa" award, with a cash prize of N1,000,000, courtesy of Clorets, in support to the Nigerian Movie Industry.

Quotes

Filmography

See also
 List of Nigerian film directors
 List of Nigerian film producers

References

External links
 Steve Gukas on IMDb
 Steve Gukas on SPLA
 

Nigerian film directors
Nigerian film producers
Living people
Year of birth missing (living people)
Nigerian television producers
University of Jos alumni
Alumni of the London Film School
Nigerian media personalities
Nigerian radio personalities
Nigerian documentary filmmakers